Reliance Cricket Stadium is cricket stadium in Nagothane, Maharashtra. Previously, the stadium was known as Indian Petrochemicals Corporation Limited Ground. The ground owned by Reliance Industries.

The stadium is one of the small-town venues in Maharashtra which has hosted two Ranji Trophy games in December, 2007 where host Maharashtra played against Delhi and Saurashtra. It has hosted one Ranji Trophy One Day in 1997/98 between Maharashtra and Baroda. In the first decade of 2000, it hosted many matches in Vizzy Trophy, Polly Umrigar Trophy, Vinoo Mankad Trophy, Vijay Merchant Trophy and Cooch Behar Trophy. Since then the stadium has local level matches only.

References

External links 
 Cricinfo
 CricketArchive

Cricket grounds in Maharashtra
Raigad district
1998 establishments in Maharashtra
Sports venues completed in 1998
20th-century architecture in India